"Moonlight Desires" is a song by Scottish-born Canadian musician Lawrence Gowan. Released in March 1987 as the lead single from his third studio album, Great Dirty World, it reached number ten in Canada. Yes's Jon Anderson, walking by the studio, hears the song being played, enters and asks if he can add a melody, and making it up on the spot, turns "Moonlight Desires" into a cult classic. This single also had a b-side called "Jet White," which was recorded in 1982 and originally appeared on Gowan's self-titled debut album.

Music video
The video was directed by Rob Quartly and was filmed in Mexico, with several of the scenes being filmed at Teotihuacan.

Popular culture
The song was used to soundtrack a key scene in the 2019 film Black Conflux.

Charts

References

1987 songs
Lawrence Gowan songs